Kurd Lasswitz (20 April 1848 – 17 October 1910) was a German author, scientist, and philosopher. He has been called "the father of German science fiction". He sometimes used the pseudonym Velatus.

Biography 
Lasswitz studied mathematics and physics at the University of Breslau and the University of Berlin, and earned his doctorate in 1873. He spent most of his career as a teacher at the Ernestine Gymnasium in Gotha (1876–1908).

Works 
The book has the Martian race running out of water, eating synthetic foods, travelling by rolling roads, and utilising space stations. His spaceships use anti-gravity, but travel realistic orbital trajectories, and use occasional mid-course corrections in travelling between Mars and the Earth; the book depicted the technically correct transit between the orbits of two planets, something poorly understood by other early science fiction writers. The book was not translated into English until 1971 (as Two Planets), and the translation is incomplete.  was his most successful novel. A story from Lasswitz's  served as the basis for "The Library of Babel", a short story by Jorge Luis Borges.

He is also known for his 1896 biography of Gustav Fechner.

For his writing (totalling around 420 works including non-fiction), Lasswitz has been called "the first utopistic-scientific writer in Germany" or even "a German Jules Verne".

A crater on Mars was named in his honour, as was the asteroid 46514 Lasswitz.

References

Further reading
 Andreas Daum, . Munich: Oldenbourg, 1998, including a short biography.

External links
 
 
 
 Kurd Laßwitz page at the 
 
 
 
 

1848 births
1910 deaths
Politicians from Wrocław
People from the Province of Silesia
University of Breslau alumni
German science fiction writers
German male writers
German schoolteachers